Catharina-Amalia, Princess of Orange (Catharina-Amalia Beatrix Carmen Victoria; born 7 December 2003) is the heir apparent to the throne of the Kingdom of the Netherlands, which consists of the constituent countries of Aruba, Curaçao, the Netherlands, and Sint Maarten.

Catharina-Amalia is the eldest child of King Willem-Alexander and Queen Máxima. She has two younger sisters, Princess Alexia and Princess Ariane. She became heir apparent when her father ascended the throne on 30 April 2013.

Birth
Princess Catharina-Amalia Beatrix Carmen Victoria was born at 17:01 CET on 7 December 2003 in the HMC Bronovo in The Hague, the first child of the then Prince Willem-Alexander (now king) and Princess Máxima. Upon the public announcement of her birth, 101 salute shots were fired at four places in the Kingdom of the Netherlands: Den Helder and The Hague in the Netherlands, Willemstad in Curaçao, and Oranjestad in Aruba.

On 12 June 2004, Catharina-Amalia was baptised by the Rev. Carel ter Linden in the Great Church in The Hague. Her godparents are her uncle Prince Constantijn, Crown Princess Victoria of Sweden, the (then) vice-president of the Council of State of the Netherlands Herman Tjeenk Willink, friend of her mother Samantha Deane, her uncle Martín Zorreguieta, and friend of her father Marc ter Haar.

Catharina-Amalia's maternal grandparents, Jorge Zorreguieta and María del Carmen Cerruti Carricart, were prohibited from attending her parents' wedding in 2002 due to Zorreguieta's involvement in the regime of General Jorge Rafael Videla, but were present at her baptism, which was a private rather than a state affair.

Early life and education
Princess Catharina-Amalia has two younger sisters: Princess Alexia (born in 2005) and Princess Ariane (born in 2007). The family spent the princess’ formative years at Villa Eikenhorst on the De Horsten estate in Wassenaar. In 2019 they moved to Huis ten Bosch Palace in The Hague. Since September 2022 she lives in a student house with her friends in Amsterdam in order to attend her new studies.

In December 2007, Catharina-Amalia started attending Bloemcamp Primary School, a public primary school in Wassenaar. After graduating from primary school, she attended the Christelijk Gymnasium Sorghvliet in The Hague, where her aunt Princess Laurentien attended. She participated in the student council and attended both the Model United Nations of the International School of The Hague and The Hague International Model United Nations conferences. She graduated in 2021 with distinction. Upon graduation, she announced that she would take a gap year and refused to accept her right to €1.6m a year in income for the time period, adding that it would make her "uncomfortable as long as I do not do anything for it in return". The Princess spent her gap year in an internship at the Orange Fund and volunteered at other organisations. Since 5 September 2022 Catharina-Amalia is studying at the University of Amsterdam for a BSc degree in Politics, Psychology, Law and Economics (PPLE). She was placed under heightened security and moved out of her student flat after a threat was identified.

Her birthdays are traditionally celebrated with a concert at the Kloosterkerk in The Hague, which is attended by ambassadors and members of the royal household and the Council of State of the Netherlands.
She speaks Dutch, English, and Spanish. Additionally, she took classes in the Mandarin Chinese language.

On her seventh birthday, a Douglas C-47 Skytrain once owned by her great-grandfather, Prince Bernhard of Lippe-Biesterfeld, was named after Catharina-Amalia by Peter Hartman. The princess herself was prevented from attending the naming ceremony owing to school obligations.

Catharina-Amalia's paternal grandmother, Queen Beatrix, abdicated on 30April 2013 and her father ascended the throne. Catharina-Amalia, as the new heir apparent, assumed the title of Princess of Orange, becoming the first to do so in her own right. On 8 December 2021, Princess Catharina-Amalia assumed her seat in the Advisory Division of the Council of State when she reached the age of majority at 18 the day before.

Public life
On 17 June 2022, together with her parents, she was among the royal guests invited to the celebrations of the 18th birthday of Princess Ingrid Alexandra of Norway. This was Catharina-Amalia's first public engagement outside of The Netherlands and the first occasion to which she was allowed to wear a tiara.

On 20 September 2022, together with her parents, she attended Prinsjesdag, where the King addressed a joint session of the States General of the Netherlands to outline government policy for the upcoming parliamentary session.

In January and February of 2023, Catharina-Amalia went on a tour of the Dutch Caribbean with her parents. They visited Aruba, Curaçao, Sint Maarten, Bonaire, Sint Eustatius, and Saba. It was her first official royal tour.

Titles, styles, honours and arms

Titles
Catharina-Amalia has been Princess of the Netherlands and Princess of Orange-Nassau since birth. Until her father's accession, she was therefore styled "Her Royal Highness Princess Catharina-Amalia of the Netherlands, Princess of Orange-Nassau". On 30 April 2013, she additionally assumed the substantive title Princess of Orange. She has since been known as "Her Royal Highness the Princess of Orange, Princess of the Netherlands, Princess of Orange-Nassau".

Honours

  Knight Grand Cross of the Order of the Netherlands Lion (7 December 2021).
  Knight of the Order of the Gold Lion of the House of Nassau (7 December 2021).

Arms

See also 
 List of current heirs apparent

References

External links

 The Princess of Orange at the website of the Royal House of the Netherlands

|-

|-

|-

2003 births
Living people
Dutch people of Argentine descent
Dutch people of Portuguese descent
Dutch people of Italian descent
Dutch people of Basque descent
Female heirs apparent
House of Orange-Nassau
Nobility from The Hague
People from Wassenaar
Princes of Orange
Princesses of Orange-Nassau
Princesses of Orange
Dutch people of Spanish descent
Daughters of kings
Protestant Church Christians from the Netherlands
Members of the Council of State (Netherlands)
Recipients of the Order of the Netherlands Lion